Maryino  is a Moscow Metro station in the Maryino District,  Moscow. It is on the Lyublinsko-Dmitrovskaya Line, between Bratislavskaya and Borisovo stations.

Maryino opened on 25 December 1996 as the terminus of the second stage of the extension of the Lyublinsky radius to the southeast. It is located in Maryino District, the most populated district of Moscow. The station's depth is 8 metres. Like Volzhskaya, the station is single deck except with a much lower ceiling and a monolithic concrete being used to cover it. The architects are V.Filippov, S.Belyakova. The ceiling of the station is broken into a series of large niches where two six-lamp chandeliers are suspended. Metallic hemispherical tiles cover the top part of the walls, black marble for lower parts. Grey and black granite form the floor.

The station has two vestibules under the Lyublinskaya street's intersection with Maryinsky and Novocherkassky boulevards. Behind the station is a set of reversal sidings and a cross junction.

On December 2, 2011 the stretch of the Lyublinsko-Dmitrovskaya Line with three stations to Zyablikovo opened, and Maryino ceased to be the terminal station.

References

External links

 Mosmetro.ru
 Metro.ru
 Mymetro.ru
 News.metro.ru
KartaMetro.info — Station location and exits on Moscow map (English/Russian)

Moscow Metro stations
Railway stations in Russia opened in 1996
Lyublinsko-Dmitrovskaya Line
Railway stations located underground in Russia